The Western Lyskamm is a subsidiary peak of the Lyskamm.

References

Alpine four-thousanders
Four-thousanders of Switzerland
Mountains of Italy
Mountains of Switzerland
Mountains of Valais
Mountains of the Alps
Pennine Alps